Lithivm (also known as Lithium Europe) is a Swedish horror thriller from 1998 directed by David Flamholc and Swedish voice acting veteran Fredrik Dolk and Johan Widerberg. The title of the film is a stylised spelling of Lithium which is used to treat people with bipolar disorder.

Plot

The bipolar Hanna gets an internship at a newspaper but is not satisfied with her duties that involve reading letters. She is pestered by her psychopathic on-and-off lover Martin and comes to believe that the divorced schizophrenic Dag is a serial killer.

Cast
Agnieszka Koson - Hanna (as Agnieszka)
Fredrik Dolk - Dag Tingström
Johan Widerberg - Martin
Yvonne Lombard - Hasse
Björn Granath - Lt. Henrik Laurentsson
Marika Lagercrantz - Margareta
Lina Perned - Marianne
Göran Forsmark - Werner
Ola Wahlström - Greidner
Måns Westfelt - Birger
Kent-Arne Dahlgren - Sten (Stone)
Simon Paulsson - Filip
Christer Holmgren - Stefan
Babben Larsson - as herself
Finn Kronsporre - Police
Jannike Grut - Police woman
Annika Sund - Police driver
Tony Lindsjö - Police

Crew

Production Designer Erika Ökvist
Assistant Director Gita Mallik
Carpenter Ayden Demirkiran	
Sound Effects by Monir Eriksson
Stunt Coordinator Lars Lundgren
Best girl Rebecka Liljeberg
Grip operated by Peter Pettersson
Sound Mixer Berndt Frithiof
First Assistant Camera Mikaël Meisen-Dietmann
Stunts by Joachim von Rost
Production Assistant Martin Goldberg
Production Assistant Marie Eklinder

About the film

The film was shot in Stockholm using 16 mm reverse film that was later blown up to 35mm. This created much grain. The cinematography Flamholc and Mårten Nilsson was going for, was a further stylisation of the techniques they had used in Nightbus 807. Lithvim was the third and final film Flamholc made with Fredrik Dolk and his final fiction film to date. The film did receive support from the Swedish Film Institute.

Response

The film bombed on the Swedish box office and was declared one of the worst Swedish films of all time. In the US the film was on the other hand received very well, the film won ”Young Filmmaker Award” at  Hollywood Film Festival. And Variety wrote: ”Flamholc visual storytelling is already a paragon of young Nordic cinema responding to — and possibly setting — late-’90s trends.” "Production values on $500,000 pic are memorable, from Kenneth Cosimo’s jarring techno score to d.p. Marten Nilsson’s stunning images, which at extreme moments saturate the screen with ultra-grainy textures in a urine-like yellow."

References

External links
 https://variety.com/1999/film/reviews/lithium-1117752036/

Swedish thriller films
1998 films
1998 thriller films
1990s Swedish films